Bryning-with-Warton is a civil parish in the Borough of Fylde in Lancashire, England.

According to the 2001 census the parish had a population of 3,572, increasing to 3,596 at the 2011 Census.

Bryning-with-Warton Parish Council is one of fifteen such councils that serves the borough of Fylde.

The parish contains one listed building, the Grade II listed 204 Lytham Road. Built in the 18th century, it is a rendered cottage with a slate roof, in two storeys and with a two-bay front.  The windows in the lower floor are three-light casements, and those in the upper floor are two-light sliding sashes.

References

Villages in Lancashire
Civil parishes in Lancashire
Geography of the Borough of Fylde